HM LST-9 was an tank landing ship of the Royal Navy in World war II.

After serving in the Mediterranean, Normandy and the Far East, LST-9 was returned to the US Navy.

Construction 
LST-9 was laid down on 9 August 1942, at Pittsburgh, Pennsylvania, by the Dravo Corporation; launched on 14 November 1942; sponsored by Mrs. Katherine Moxin;  transferred to the Royal Navy on 19 March 1943, and commissioned the following day.

Service history 
LST-9 sailed from Hampton Roads, Virginia, for the Mediterranean on 14 May 1943, with convoy UGS 8A, arriving in Oran, French Algeria, sometime before 8 June 1943.

She participated in the invasion of Sicily, the landings at Reggio, the invasion of Vibo Valentia, and the Anzio landings in the Mediterranean theatre, and the Normandy landings in the European theatre.

She made 57 ferry trips across the Strait of Messina. LST-9 was refit at Leith, Scotland, from 11 April to 3 June 1944, setting out from Leith in time for the Normandy landings. On 25 January 1945, she collided with a jetty at the Port of Tilbury. In April 1945, she was at Antwerp, Belgium, for minor defect repairs before being refitted at Antwerp from May to June 1945.

LST-9 also participated in the landings in Malaya, Operation Zipper. She was decommissioned on 4 May 1946, at Subic Bay, Philippines. LST-9 was returned to the US Navy on 1 June 1946, struck from the Navy list on 3 July 1946 and sold to Bosey, Philippines on 5 September 1948.

References

Bibliography

External links
 

1942 ships
Ships built in Pittsburgh
LST-1-class tank landing ships of the Royal Navy
World War II amphibious warfare vessels of the United Kingdom
Ships built by Dravo Corporation